International Izmir Festival is an arts festival held annually in İzmir, Turkey and organized by the İzmir Foundation for Culture Arts and Education (İKSEV). It is a member of the European Festivals Association. It was held for the first time in 1987 under the name İzmir International Culture and Arts Festival. The most recent edition of the festival was held between 26 May 2018 and 7 July 2018.

References

External links 
 

Festivals in İzmir
Annual events in Turkey
Music festivals in Turkey
Theatre festivals in Turkey
Recurring events established in 1987
1987 establishments in Turkey